The Bloc Pot is a provincial political party in Quebec, Canada that is dedicated to ending cannabis prohibition. It has contested four provincial elections but it has failed to win any seats in the National Assembly of Quebec. The party was launched in 1997 by Marc-Boris St-Maurice as a way to push for political change to marijuana laws. He also went on to launch its federal offspring, the Marijuana Party of Canada.

Leaders of the Bloc Pot
 Marc-Boris St-Maurice (1998–2000)
 Pierre Audette (2000–2001)
 Alexandre Néron (acting, 2001–2002)
 Hugô St-Onge (2002–)

Election results

See also
 Drug policy reform
 Cannabis in Quebec
 Legal issues of cannabis
 List of Quebec general elections
 List of Quebec leaders of the Opposition
 List of Quebec premiers
 Marijuana parties
 Marijuana Party (Canada)
 National Assembly of Quebec
 Political parties in Quebec
 Politics of Quebec
 Timeline of Quebec history

External links
Official website
National Assembly historical information
La Politique québécoise sur le Web

Cannabis political parties of Canada
Provincial political parties in Quebec
Political parties established in 1998
Organizations based in Montreal
1998 establishments in Quebec
1998 in cannabis
Cannabis in Quebec